Ross Blyth (born 30 April 1961) is a British former alpine skier who competed in the 1980 Winter Olympics.

References

External links
 

1961 births
Living people
British male alpine skiers
Olympic alpine skiers of Great Britain
Alpine skiers at the 1980 Winter Olympics